Józef Emanuel Jankowski (1790–1847) was a professor of philosophy at Kraków University.

Life
Jankowski was Feliks Jaroński's successor as professor of philosophy at Kraków University from 1818 and author of a Logic.

Jankowski was one of nearly all the university professors of philosophy in Poland before the November 1830–31 Uprising who held a position that shunned both Positivism and metaphysical speculation, affined to the Scottish philosophers but linked in certain respects to Kantian critique.

See also
History of philosophy in Poland
List of Poles

Notes

References
Władysław Tatarkiewicz, Zarys dziejów filozofii w Polsce (A Brief History of Philosophy in Poland), [in the series:] Historia nauki polskiej w monografiach (History of Polish Learning in Monographs), [volume] XXXII, Kraków, Polska Akademia Umiejętności (Polish Academy of Learning), 1948. This monograph draws from pertinent sections in earlier editions of the author's Historia filozofii (History of Philosophy).

1790 births
1847 deaths
19th-century Polish philosophers